Terra incognita or terra ignota (Latin "unknown land"; incognita is stressed on its second syllable in Latin, but with variation in pronunciation in English) is a term used in cartography for regions that have not been mapped or documented. The expression is believed to be first seen in Ptolemy's Geography c. 150.  The term was reintroduced in the 15th century from the rediscovery of Ptolemy's work during the Age of Discovery.  The equivalent on French maps would be terres inconnues (plural form), and some English maps may show Parts Unknown.

Similarly, uncharted or unknown seas would be labeled mare incognitum, Latin for "unknown sea".

Details 

An urban legend claims that cartographers labelled such regions with "Here be dragons". Although cartographers did claim that fantastic beasts (including large serpents) existed in remote corners of the world and depicted such as decoration on their maps, only one known surviving map, the Hunt–Lenox Globe, in the collection of the New York Public Library, 
actually says "Here are dragons" (using the Latin form "HIC SVNT DRACONES"). However, ancient Roman and Medieval cartographers did use the phrase HIC SVNT LEONES (Here are lions) when denoting unknown territories on maps.

Alternatively, 'terra incognita' may also refer to the hypothesized continent Terra Australis Incognita ("The unknown land of the South"), as seen in the Theatrum Orbis Terrarum map by Abraham Ortelius (1570).

During the 19th century, terra incognita disappeared from maps; both the coastlines and the inner parts of the continents became fully explored, even prior to the advent of aerial photography and satellite imagery in the 20th century. However, the bottoms of oceans remain mostly unmapped, as do many other land surfaces in the Solar System. For example, only 40% of the surface of Neptune's Moon Triton has been mapped with the remainder being terra incognita.

The phrase is now used metaphorically to describe any unexplored subject or field of research.

Etymology
 Terra: Latin for 'earth' or 'land'. Related English words include terrestrial, territory and terrain.
 Incognita: from Latin cognoscere 'to know, be acquainted with' (negated by the prefix 'in-'), which is related to English know and Greek γνῶσις gnosis 'knowledge'. Related English words include agnostic, cognition, gnosticism.

For more history of the terms, see Terra Australis, and also Etymology at Australia.

See also

Notes

References

Guide to the Research Collections. pp. 207–208.  New York Public Library.

Cartography
Latin words and phrases